Clown Alley was a 1980s San Francisco Bay area punk rock band.

Band members 
David Duran – vocals
Mark Deutrom – guitar
Lori Black – bass 
Justin Clayton – drums

Deutrom and Black (who is the daughter of Shirley Temple Black) eventually joined the Melvins.

Discography 
Circus of Chaos (1985, Alchemy Records, VM101)

References 

Circus of Chaos review, Exclaim!
Circus of Chaos review, Dusted
Circus of Chaos review, Brainwashed

Musical groups from the San Francisco Bay Area
Punk rock groups from California